Mark Joko (born 25 November 1986) is a South African cricketer. He played in one first-class and two List A matches for Border in 2008 and 2009.

See also
 List of Border representative cricketers

References

External links
 

1986 births
Living people
South African cricketers
Border cricketers